Alaena subrubra is a butterfly in the family Lycaenidae. It is found in southern Sudan, northern Uganda and the Central African Republic.

The larvae have been reported feeding on Rhus species, but this seems highly doubtful.

References

Butterflies described in 1915
Alaena
Taxa named by George Thomas Bethune-Baker